Eucalyptus Island is a small island in the Sacramento–San Joaquin River Delta. It is part of Contra Costa County, California. It appears on a 1978 USGS map of the area.

References

Islands of Contra Costa County, California
Islands of the Sacramento–San Joaquin River Delta
Islands of Northern California